The FIS Nordic World Ski Championships 1950 took place during February 1–6, 1950 in Lake Placid, New York, United States and Rumford, Maine, United States. This was Lake Placid's second time hosting the championships after having done so at the 1932 Winter Olympics. It also marked the first time after World War II the event took place after the Winter Olympics in a non-Olympic year (St. Moritz, Switzerland hosted the 1948 Winter Olympics two years earlier), the second time the world championships occurred outside Europe, the first time they had occurred outside Europe in a non-Olympic year, and the only time the United States has hosted the event in a non-Olympic year.  The ski-jumping events were held at Lake Placid, while the cross-country skiing events (originally planned to also be held at Lake Placid) were moved to Rumford due to insufficient snow.

Men's cross country

18 km 

February 3, 1950

50 km 

February 6, 1950

4 × 10 km relay

February 5, 1950

Men's Nordic combined

Individual 

February 1, 1950 - Jumping
February 3, 1950 – 18 km (included in the "Special 18km-run")

Men's ski jumping

Individual large hill 

February 5, 1950
MacKenzie Intervale Ski Jumping Complex

Medal table

References
FIS 1950 Cross country results
FIS 1950 Nordic combined results
FIS 1950 Ski jumping results
Hansen, Hermann & Sveen, Knut. (1996) VM på ski '97. Alt om ski-VM 1925-1997 Trondheim: Addresseavisens Forlag. p. 66. . 

FIS Nordic World Ski Championships
1950 in Nordic combined
International sports competitions hosted by the United States
Rumford, Maine
Sports competitions in Maine
1950 in sports in Maine
1950 in sports in New York (state)
Sports in Lake Placid, New York
February 1950 sports events in the United States
International sports competitions in New York (state)
Nordic skiing competitions in the United States